Bazar-e-Husn  is a Pakistani drama film written by Pervez Kalim, co-directed by Javed Fazil and Sarwar Bhatti who co-produced it also, with Akhtar Bhatti and  Akbar Bhatti. The film features Nadeem Baig, Salma Agha, Samina Peerzada, Jehan Zeb, Faisal Rehman and Rangeela. It was released on 9 September 1988 and was a box office success. The film won 6 trophies at 1988 Nigar Awards.

Plot 

The film's plot revolves around a film director who wants to cast a beautiful and natural heroine for his next film. For this purpose, he enters in a kotha, chooses a tawaif and falls for her.

Tariq is a famous film director who lives a happy life with her wife Abida and two children. He enters in Red Light District to choose the female lead for his film where he selects Gori who acts and dances well. During the film's shooting, Gori's beauty impresses Tariq and he falls for her. He ignores his wife and children ultimately causes adverse relations with his family. He starts spend time with Gori while on the other hand, Gori considering it a good method to lead a joyful life, lusts for more.

Cast 
 Nadeem Baig
 Salma Agha
 Rangeela
 Samina Peerzada
 Jehan Zeb
 Faisal Rehman
 Talish
 Naghma
 Albela

Production 
The film was written by Pervez Kalim, directed by Javed Fazil and Sarwar Bhatti who also produced it along with Akhtar Bhatti and Akbar Bhatti as a co-producer. Cinematography performed by Irshad Bhatti and editing by Humayun Pervaiz.

Soundtrack 
The soundtrack was composed by Manzoor Ashraf. The songs were performed by Salma Agha, Mehnaz Begum and Humaira Channa.

Remake 

The film was remade in Bollywood titled, Pati Patni Aur Tawaif in 1990 and Salma Agha respired her role in it.

Awards and nominations

References

External links 

 

1988 films